Yeon Cheon Oh (born 1951) is a South Korean academic. He served as the president of Seoul National University from 2010 to 2014, and as president of University of Ulsan since 2015.

Early life
Oh received his B.A. degree in political science from Seoul National University in 1984. In 1982, he received his Ph.D. degree in public administration from New York University in the United States.

Career
From 1983 to 2010, he was a professor at school of public policy, Seoul National University. From 2000 to 2004, he was dean of the graduate school of public administration at the same university. From 2010-2014, he was the president of Seoul National University. From 2014 to 2015, he was the Koret Fellow at Stanford University Shorenstein Asia-Pacific Research Center. In 2015, he became the president of University of Ulsan. In 2016, he established a cooperation agreement between the University of Zagreb in Croatia and the University of Ulsan.

Awards
In 2005, Oh was awarded the Order of Service Merit for the development of information technology in South Korea.

References

Seoul National University alumni
New York University alumni
Academic staff of Seoul National University
1951 births
Living people
University of Ulsan
Presidents of Seoul National University